Zutulba ocellaris is a moth of the family Zygaenidae. It is found in South Africa.

References

Endemic moths of South Africa
Zygaeninae
Moths of Africa
Moths described in 1874